The Battle of Sena Gallica, was a naval battle fought off the Italian Adriatic coast in the autumn of 551 between an East Roman (Byzantine) and an Ostrogoth fleet, during the Gothic War (535–554). It marked the end of the Goths' brief bid to deny the seas to the Romans, and the beginning of the Byzantine resurgence in the war under the leadership of Narses.

It was also the last major sea battle fought in the Mediterranean for more than a century, until the Battle of the Masts in 654.

Background 
In 550, the Gothic War was in its fifteenth year. The first years of the war had seen a series of successes for the relatively small Byzantine invasion force under Belisarius, which had led to the fall of Ravenna and the apparent restoration of Imperial rule over Italy by 540. Subsequently, Emperor Justinian I recalled Belisarius. The commanders left behind soon started squabbling with each other, while the Goths rallied their forces. Under the leadership of their charismatic new king, Totila, they soon reversed the situation, overrunning the Imperial forces. Not even the return of Belisarius could stem the Ostrogothic tide: by 550, the East Romans were left with a handful of coastal strongholds in the mainland, and in the spring of that year, Totila even invaded Sicily, the Romans' strategic base. Wishing to deny the Imperials easy access to Italy and the ability to land fresh troops or reinforce their outposts, Totila had also created a navy of 400 warships to contest the seas with the Empire. At the same time, Justinian prepared one last major effort to reclaim Italy, under the eunuch Narses.

Totila, aware of the looming threat, was determined to deny his enemies their last important bases on Italian soil, most prominently Croton and Ancona. After withdrawing from Sicily laden with spoils, Totila sent his troops to besiege Ancona. 47 ships blockaded it from the sea, and the rest of the Gothic fleet, 300 ships strong, was sent to raid the coast of Epirus and the Ionian Islands. Ancona was likely to fall soon, and therefore the Roman general Valerian, commander of Ravenna, called upon John, a very experienced general who was stationed at Salona in Dalmatia awaiting the arrival of Narses and his army, to send a relief force. John immediately manned 38 ships with his veterans, and was soon joined by 12 more ships from Ravenna under Valerian himself.

Battle and aftermath
As the two fleets were almost equal, the two Gothic commanders, Indulf and Gibal (the former a renegade retainer of Belisarius), resolved to meet the Romans in battle immediately, and sailed to meet them.

Unlike in classical Antiquity, the warships of the 6th century did not feature rams; naval combat was therefore dominated by missile exchanges and boarding actions. In this form of combat, experience and the ability to maintain a formation of ships was essential, and the Byzantine crews held the advantage over the inexperienced Goths. Soon, in the heat of battle, some Gothic ships drifted off the main body and were easily destroyed, while others sailed too close together and were unable to maneuver. In the end, the weary Gothic fleet disintegrated and their ships fled as best as they could. They lost 36 ships, and Gibal was captured, while Indulf with the remainder fled towards Ancona. As soon as he came close to the Gothic army's camp, he beached his ships and set them on fire.

This staggering defeat disheartened the Gothic force, which immediately abandoned the siege of Ancona and withdrew. Followed soon after by a series of Roman successes, the battle of Sena Gallica marked the beginning of the turn of the tide of the Gothic War in the Empire's favour.

See also 
 Byzantine navy

References

Sources 
 Procopius, De Bello Gothico IV.23 (= Wars VIII.23)
 
 

551
Sena Gallica
Sena Gallica
Sena Gallica
History of the Adriatic Sea
550s in the Byzantine Empire
Sena Gallica